Dayve Hawk (born 1981), better known by his stage name Memory Tapes, is an American singer-songwriter and record producer, and the former frontman of the Philadelphia-based band, Hail Social.

Career
After releasing material under the names "Memory Cassette" and "Weird Tapes", and on signing to Something in Construction to release a Memory Cassette EP (also on Acephale), Memory Tapes' first LP, Seek Magic, was released in September 2009 through the labels Something in Construction, Sincerely Yours and Acéphale. It was self-released in the U.S. Seek Magic sold over 1,000 copies on pre-release through Rough Trade, a shop in London, and has since sold over 30,000. The CD release of Seek Magic was bundled with a four-track bonus disc including a Horrors' remix and a 22-minute instrumental, "Treeship", which could also be downloaded from his website for free.

Memory Tapes was initially associated with the chillwave music genre, but is seen more as a producer in his own right. Each album has its own separate feel and instrumentation. Seek Magic used a lot of dance rhythms and sounds and had touchstones such as New Order and Cocteau Twins. Hawk plays everything on his records and uses unusual sounds such as a bicycle pump on the track "Bicycle" and the sound of sneakers on a basketball court on "Green Knight".

His second album, Player Piano, was released in 2011 via Something in Construction in Europe, Carpark Records in the U.S. and Inertia in Australia. He was quoted as saying it would be "psychedelic girl group music". The music on the album reflected more of a "band" sound than his previous works, and also lacked their reliance on sonic saturation and obfuscation. Pitchfork described the album as "flat and airless, sucked dry of his typically evocative detailing" and gave it a mixed review, scoring it 6 out of 10. The first track from these sessions, "Today Is Our Life", appeared on a large number of blogs earlier in 2011, and the album came out the following July.

Memory Tapes' first live performance was in Manchester, England, in January 2010 and he has since played in North America, Europe and Australia. The live shows in 2010 were with a drummer, Matt Maraldo, and a backing track.

On October 2, 2012, Hawk released the first single from his third album, Grace/Confusion, which was released on December 4, 2012.

Personal life
Hawk lives in Shamong Township, New Jersey with his wife and two daughters.

Discography

Albums
 Seek Magic (2009)
 Player Piano (2011)
 Grace/Confusion (2012)

EPs
 The Hiss We Missed (as Memory Cassette) (2008)
 Rewind While Sleeping (as Memory Cassette) (2008)
 Call & Response (as Memory Cassette) (2009)

Singles
 "Bicycle" (2009)
 "Graphics" (Re-modal edit) (2010)
 "Yes I Know"/"First Hills" (2011)
 "Fallout"/"House On Fire" (2015)

References

1981 births
Living people
American electronic musicians
American male singer-songwriters
Record producers from New Jersey
Singer-songwriters from New Jersey
Chillwave musicians
Carpark Records artists